The panatela silverside (Hypoatherina panatela) is a species of reef-dwelling silverside from the subfamily Atherinomorinae which is found in the southwest Pacific Ocean. This species is the only species in the genus Stenatherina, although some authorities place it in the genus Hypoatherina. This species was described by David Starr Jordan and Robert Earl Richardson as Atherina panatela with the type locality given as Calayan Island in the Philippines. The specific name is the Spanish word for a long, thin cigar and is presumed to be a reference to the elongated, slender body of this fish.

References

Atherinomorinae
Fish described in 1908
Taxa named by David Starr Jordan